El destino se disculpa   is a 1945 Spanish drama film directed by José Luis Sáenz de Heredia.

It is based on the novel El fantasma ('The Ghost') written by Wenceslao Fernández Flórez who co-wrote the screenplay.

References

External links
 

1944 films
1945 drama films
1945 films
1940s Spanish-language films
Spanish black-and-white films
Spain in fiction
Films based on Spanish novels
Films directed by José Luis Sáenz de Heredia
Spanish drama films
1944 drama films
1940s Spanish films